Zaręby  may refer to the following places:
Zaręby, Grodzisk Mazowiecki County in Masovian Voivodeship (east-central Poland)
Zaręby, Maków County in Masovian Voivodeship (east-central Poland)
Zaręby, Podlaskie Voivodeship (north-east Poland)
Zaręby, Nowy Dwór Mazowiecki County in Masovian Voivodeship (east-central Poland)
Zaręby, Przasnysz County in Masovian Voivodeship (east-central Poland)
Zaręby, Warmian-Masurian Voivodeship (north Poland)
Zaręby, West Pomeranian Voivodeship (north-west Poland)